ITI Limited, earlier known as Indian Telephone Industries Limited, is a central public sector undertaking in India. It is under the ownership of Department of Telecommunications, Ministry of Communications , Government of India. It was founded in 1948 as a departmental factory, incorporated as a public company in 1950 and today has six manufacturing facilities at Bengaluru, Naini, Mankapur, Raebareli, Palakkad and Srinagar which produce a range of switching, transmission, access and subscriber premises equipment. It is headquartered at Bengaluru. It has multi-locational electronic assembly and mechanical manufacturing facilities, countrywide marketing and customer support centers and in-house R&D for absorption of technology, indigenous development of products for in-house manufacturing. It produces GSM mobile equipments at its Mankapur and Raebareli facilities. These two facilities supply more than nine million lines per annum to both domestic as well as foreign markets. The Palakkad unit is responsible for data handling with assembly and personalization of smart cards and electronic manufacturing facilities for PCB's, HDPE Pipe, Smart Energy Meters, Micro PC under Smart City Mission etc. It also produces Information and Communication Technology (ICT) equipments such as network management systems, encryption and networking for internet connectivity, and secure communications networks and equipment for the defense. The company has more than 2000 employees  January 1, 2023.  On 01-10-2020, ITI Limited signed a contract with Defense to implement Rs 7796 Crore ASCON Phase-IV project.

References

Sources

External links
Government of India - Department of Telecommunications - Public Sector Units
About ITI Limited (https://itiltd.in/)

Telecommunications companies of India
Companies based in Bangalore
Manufacturing companies established in 1948
Economy of Karnataka
Government-owned companies of India
Manufacturing plants in Uttar Pradesh
Indian companies established in 1948
Companies listed on the National Stock Exchange of India
Companies listed on the Bombay Stock Exchange
1948 establishments in India